Semitic romanization is the process (generally called romanization) by which Semitic languages are transliterated into the Latin alphabet. The Semitic languages emerged in the Middle East during prehistory. Contemporary Semitic languages are almost all natively written in various abjads or alphabets such as the Arabic, Amharic, and Hebrew scripts. A notable exception is Maltese, which is the only Semitic language with a standard native form written in the Latin script.

Romanization schemes for specific Semitic languages 
Romanization schemes for Proto-Semitic and various Semitic languages (Semitic abjads):
Romanization of Arabic
ISO 233
DIN 31635
Romanization of Hebrew
ISO 259

See also
Transliteration of Ancient Egyptian
Semitic abjad#Descendants of the Semitic abjad
Cuneiform#Transliteration
Proto-Sinaitic alphabet

Sources 

 Khan, Geoffrey., Watson, Janet C. E., Weninger, Stefan. The Semitic Languages: An International Handbook. Germany: De Gruyter, 2011.
 George, Coulter H.. How Dead Languages Work. United Kingdom: Oxford University Press, 2020 (p.195-99).

Romanization